Undisputed Attitude is the seventh studio album by American thrash metal band Slayer, released on May 28, 1996, by American Recordings. The album consists almost entirely of covers of punk rock and hardcore punk songs, and also includes two tracks written by guitarist Jeff Hanneman in 1984 and 1985 for a side project called Pap Smear; its closing track, "Gemini", is the only original track. The cover songs on the album were originally recorded by the bands the Stooges, Minor Threat, T.S.O.L., D.R.I., D.I., Dr. Know, and Verbal Abuse, whose work was prominently featured with the inclusion of cover versions of three of their songs.

Undisputed Attitude peaked at number 34 on the US Billboard 200.

Recording
Undisputed Attitude was recorded at Capitol Studios in Los Angeles with Dave Sardy as producer and Reign in Blood producer Rick Rubin as executive producer. Recorded in three to four weeks, the album was largely the brainchild of guitarist Kerry King, who stated that the songs chosen were from highly influential bands who "made Slayer what it is". The album was initially to feature material from classic heavy metal artists such as Judas Priest, UFO and Deep Purple. However, after several rehearsals "things didn't pan out" according to King, so the band instead elected to cover punk songs.

Slayer considered covering 1960s psychedelic rock band the Doors as they were an influence to vocalist and bassist Tom Araya. When asked which track they considered recording, Araya responded, "Maybe 'When the Music's Over', 'Five to One', something like that."  A cover of Black Flag's "Rise Above" was suggested by Rubin, although was shelved after the band was not sure how to arrange it musically.

Guitarist Jeff Hanneman had written four unreleased songs in 1984–1985 while in the side project Pap Smear with Slayer drummer Dave Lombardo and Suicidal Tendencies guitarist Rocky George. The band chose the best two, namely "Ddamm (Drunk Drivers Against Mad Mothers)" and "Can't Stand You". "Gemini" was written by King and Araya several months before entering the recording studio. King asserts it is the only Slayer song on the album. The song begins as a sludge/doom number, before becoming a more typical Slayer song.

The band's cover of Minor Threat's "Guilty of Being White" raised questions about a possible message of white supremacy. The controversy involved the changing of the refrain "guilty of being white" to "guilty of being right", at the song's ending. This incensed Minor Threat frontman Ian MacKaye, who stated "that is so offensive to me". King said the lyric was altered for "tongue-in-cheek" humor, saying that the band thought racism was "ridiculous" at the time.

Reception

Undisputed Attitude was released on May 28, 1996, and peaked at number 34 on the Billboard 200 album chart. Paul Kott of AllMusic commented that "Undisputed Attitude, while not perfect, is a fitting tribute to the bands that inspired Slayer to break from the traditional metal mould." Sandy Masuo of Rolling Stone reasoned: "some punk purists will undoubtedly cry foul, but when the dust settles it's hard to argue with Slayer's mettle." Entertainment Weekly Chuck Eddy dubbed Slayer's cover interpretations "generic hardcore-punk", and observed that the group "seem to think that playing as fast and rigidly as possible makes for harder rock -- but it's just lazy shtick."

Reviewing 2003 Slayer box set Soundtrack to the Apocalypse, Adrien Begrand of PopMatters dismissed the effort as "easily the weakest album in the Slayer catalogue", while Westword Online Michael Roberts dubbed the record their "biggest mistake." Araya has since stated that he "knew it wouldn't do very well, people want to hear Slayer! The real die-hards picked up on it and that was expected."

Track listing

Personnel

Slayer
 Tom Araya – bass, vocals
 Kerry King – guitars
 Jeff Hanneman – guitars
 Paul Bostaph – drums

Production and artwork
 Dave Sardy – producer, mixing
 Rick Rubin – executive producer
 Greg Gordon – engineer
 Ralph Cacciurri; Bryan Davis; Jim Giddens; Bill Smith – assistant engineers
 Stephen Marcussen – mastering
 Wes Benscoter – artwork, illustrations
 Dennis Keeley – photography
 Michael Lavine – front cover photo, photography
 Dirk Walter – art direction, design

Charts

References

Albums produced by Rick Rubin
Covers albums
Albums produced by Dave Sardy
Albums with cover art by Wes Benscoter
1996 compilation albums
Slayer compilation albums
American Recordings (record label) compilation albums
Albums recorded at Capitol Studios